The Santosham Best Dialogues Award is given by the Santosham Film magazine as part of its annual Santosham Film Awards for Telugu films.

The award was first given in 2003. Here is a list of the award winners and the films for which they won.

References 

Santosham Film Awards